The Seine at Rouen is an 1872 oil on canvas painting by Claude Monet, now part of the Otto Krebs collection at the Hermitage Museum in Saint Petersburg. It shows a sunny scene of sailing boats moored by the quays on the Seine in Rouen.

Other Monets in the Hermitage
Woman in the Garden (1867),  
The Seine at Asnières (1873), 
The Grand Quai at Le Havre (1874), 
Woman in a Garden (1876), 
Garden (1876), 
Corner of a Garden in Montgeron (1876),
Pond at Montgeron (1877), 
Garden at Bordighera, Morning (1884),
Poppy Field (1886), 
Mill at Giverny (1886), 
Near Giverny, Sunrise (1888), 
Cliffs Near Dieppe (1897),
Waterloo Bridge (1903).

A retrospective of works by Monet (including The Seine at Rouen) was held at the Hermitage from February to May 2002, with most of his surviving works from all around the world.

References

Bibliography 
  Albert Kostenevitch, Catalogue de l'exposition de la peinture française des XIXe et XXe siècles [à l'Ermitage] issue des collections privées d'Allemagne, Culture Ministry of the Russian Federation, Hermitage Museum, Saint Petersburg, 1995, German translation published by Kindler, Munich, 1995

1872 paintings
Paintings by Claude Monet
Paintings in the collection of the Hermitage Museum
Cityscape paintings
Rouen